Kitchen Whiz is an Australian children's cooking game show on the Nine Network and 9Go!. Children test their skills in the kitchen by completing fun challenges with a partner in a short amount of time. The team who has the most points by the end of the episode goes home with prizes ranging from experiences to cooking appliances.

The series began airing on 21 February 2011, presented by Beau Walker aka Nitro with Andy Trieu as the ninja. In 2013, the show returned with a new host Alice Zaslavsky and a focus on education and interactive media with the release of a Kitchen Whiz Digital App.

References

External links
 Kitchen Whiz website

Nine Network original programming
9Go! original programming
Australian children's game shows
Australian children's television series
Australian cooking television series
2011 Australian television series debuts
2015 Australian television series endings
2010s Australian game shows
English-language television shows